Ulysses S. Mace House is a historic home located at New Bern, Craven County, North Carolina.  It was built in 1885, and is a two-story, two bay by three bay, side-hall plan, Italianate style frame dwelling. It has a side and "L"-shaped rear wing. It features a series of demi-hexagonal pavilions and the ornate bracketed cornice below a flat roof.

It was listed on the National Register of Historic Places in 1973.

References

Houses on the National Register of Historic Places in North Carolina
Italianate architecture in North Carolina
Houses completed in 1885
Houses in New Bern, North Carolina
National Register of Historic Places in Craven County, North Carolina